"The Pirates of Orion" is the second season premiere episode of the American animated science fiction television series Star Trek: The Animated Series, the 17th episode overall. It first aired on NBC on September 7, 1974. It was directed by Bill Reed, and written by Howard Weinstein. The episode was Weinstein's first professional sale at the age of 19, making him, as of 2018, the youngest writer of any Star Trek TV episode.

Set in the 23rd century, the series follows the adventures of Captain James T. Kirk (voiced by William Shatner) and the crew of the Starfleet starship Enterprise. In this episode, Kirk and the Enterprise must contend with pirates who have stolen a load of cargo that includes medicine crucial to save a dying Spock (voiced by Leonard Nimoy).

The story was developed from Weinstein out of a Star Trek-based short story he had previously published in a school science fiction publication. After it failed to be read on the first submission, it was resubmitted and purchased by the production team. The episode featured the first appearance of male members of the Orion species in the Star Trek franchise; male Orions would not appear in a live action episode until 2004. Critical reception to the episode was mixed, and it has been released in several forms of home media, including VHS, LaserDisc and DVD.

Plot 
On stardate 6334.1, the Federation starship Enterprise is on its way to planet Deneb V when the Vulcan First Officer, Spock (voiced by Leonard Nimoy), contracts the disease choriocytosis and is diagnosed by Chief Medical Officer Leonard McCoy (voiced by DeForest Kelley) with having only days to live. The Starfleet freighter SS Huron is to rendezvous with the Enterprise and deliver medicine direly needed for the cure, when it is attacked by Orion pirates who steal its cargo, which turns out to be primarily a sizable load of dilithium crystals.

The Enterprise follows back on the rendezvous course and finds the battered Huron and its surviving crew. Analysis of the attack leads Captain Kirk (voiced by William Shatner) and his crew to chase the Orion ship in a desperate attempt to recover the cure before time runs out. The Orions, knowing they cannot escape the Enterprise or best them in a fight, plan to destroy both themselves and the Enterprise in order to protect the lie of "Orion neutrality". Kirk meets with the Orion Captain (voiced by James Doohan) on a highly unstable asteroid which the Orions plan to detonate to carry out their plot. Kirk and the Enterprise crew realize the Orion Captain is carrying an explosive trigger in his pack and are able to neutralize it. They recover the medicine to save Spock, capture the Orion Captain (who orders his crew to abort the self-destruct, which would now be a pointless loss of life, and surrender) and retrieve the dilithium crystals.

Production 
Writer Howard Weinstein had been a fan of space exploration following the flight of NASA astronaut Alan Shepard on Mercury-Redstone 3. He recalled that his first experience of Star Trek was in middle school, where he mixed elements of the show up with Lost in Space. He began watching the show and was inspired to write for television after reading The Making of Star Trek by Gene Roddenberry and Stephen E. Whitfield. While in the 11th grade, he had a Star Trek short story published in the fanzine Probe, which was a yearly publication in East Meadow High School. Weinstein also wrote a script for Mission: Impossible, but the script was turned down as it was not submitted via an agent. It was returned with a list of suggested agents, and his father recognised Bill Cooper's name on the list from their school years together.

Cooper agreed to take on Weinstein, who decided to redevelop his Probe published short story into a script for the animated Star Trek. Cooper addressed the script to D.C. Fontana, who had recently left the show. When it arrived at the production office, it was forwarded to Fontana unread, who sent it back to Cooper as she had left the show. The script was subsequently resubmitted by Weinstein under his agent's name for the second season of the show. Producer Lou Scheimer contacted Weinstein and informed him that they wanted to purchase the script if the ending could be modified, which Weinstein agreed to. Weinstein was 19 at the time and staying in the dormitory at the University of Connecticut, and Scheimer was surprised to find out that Weinstein was so young.

The script sold in April 1974. It was Weinstein's first professional sale and credit as a writer. He found out later that year that it would be used as the opening episode of the second season. Weinstein organized a get together in his dormitory to watch the episode when it aired, which some thirty people and a dog attended. After the script was used, Weinstein found that it enabled him to write the Star Trek novel The Covenant of the Crown for Pocket Books; he said in a later interview that it gave him "instant credibility" with the company. He also began to appear at science fiction conventions and later wrote several further Star Trek books and comic books. Weinstein received a "Thank You" credit on Star Trek IV: The Voyage Home after introducing that film's director, Leonard Nimoy, to the idea of including whales in the film.

This episode features the first appearance of male Orions. While a surgically altered agent who appeared as an Andorian in The Original Series episode "Journey to Babel" was speculated to be of Orion origin by Spock, the only members of the race which had previously been represented in Star Trek were the Orion slave girls. Male Orions would not be seen in a live action Star Trek production until 2004 with the episode "Borderland" in the fourth season of Star Trek: Enterprise.

Reception 
"The Pirates of Orion" was first broadcast on September 7, 1974 on NBC. In Trek Navigator, a book by Mark A. Altman and Edward Gross which reviewed every episode and film of Star Trek up until 1998, Altman gave "The Pirates of Orion" a score of two out of four, while Gross gave a score of three out of four. Michelle Erica Green watched the episode for the website TrekNation, saying that it included "precisely the sort of character interaction that made the original Star Trek such a success". She felt that given the ability of The Animated Series to show things that couldn't be seen in The Original Series due to the budget restrictions, that the appearance of the Orions could have been increased and if the attack on the Huron had been shown then it would have given "a stronger opinion as viewers of the relative evils of the Orions, whether they are an honorable enemy or mere vicious thugs."

A 2018 Star Trek binge-watching guide by Den of Geek, recommended this episode for featuring the trio of characters Kirk, Spock, and Bones of The Original Series.

Home media release 
"The Pirates of Orion" was released on VHS cassette alongside "The Practical Joker" during the initial release of tapes by Paramount Home Video in 1989. It has also been released on LaserDisc as part of the series set. The first release of Star Trek: The Animated Series on DVD was through fan made productions. The official DVD release was on November 21, 2006 in the United States, which was a single release containing all episodes from both seasons of the television show.

Notes

References

External links 
 
 

1974 American television episodes
Star Trek: The Animated Series episodes
Piracy in fiction